Aleksei Pavlovich Peplov (born 5 January 1977) is a former Russian football player.

External links
 

1977 births
Living people
Russian footballers
Association football forwards
FC Rostov players
Russian Premier League players
FC Kuban Krasnodar players
Place of birth missing (living people)
FC Torpedo NN Nizhny Novgorod players